The 2012 Kazakhstan First Division was the 18th edition of Kazakhstan First Division, the second level football competition in Kazakhstan. 15 teams to play against each other on home-away system.. The top team gains promotion to the Premier League next season, while the second-placed team enters playoff series with the eleventh team of the Premier League.

Teams

League table

External links
soccerway.com; standings, results, fixtures

Kazakhstan First Division seasons
2
Kazakhstan
Kazakhstan